Albert Späni (born 24 December 1927) is a Swiss former sports shooter. He competed at the 1960 Summer Olympics and the 1968 Summer Olympics.

References

External links
 

1927 births
Possibly living people
Swiss male sport shooters
Olympic shooters of Switzerland
Shooters at the 1960 Summer Olympics
Shooters at the 1968 Summer Olympics
Sportspeople from the canton of Schwyz